Lucien Lebaillif (born 1897, date of death unknown) was a French swimmer. He competed in the men's 200 metre breaststroke and men's 400 metre breaststroke events at the 1920 Summer Olympics.

References

External links
 

1897 births
Year of death missing
French male breaststroke swimmers
Olympic swimmers of France
Swimmers at the 1920 Summer Olympics
Place of birth missing